Jaber Abu Hussein (Arabic: جابر أبو حسين; c. 1913–1992), an Arabic poet and singer of the Taghribat Bani Hilal (also known in the Middle East as Al Seera Al Hilaleyah ).

See also
 In Arabic:Al Sira Al Hilaleya

References

1910s births
20th-century Egyptian male singers
1992 deaths